Bathytoma murdochi is a recent and fossil species of sea snail, a marine gastropod mollusk in the family Borsoniidae.

Distribution
This marine species occurs off New Zealand  and Tasmania

Description
The height of the biconic shell varies between 23 mm and 27 mm.

References

External links
  Spencer H.G., Willan R.C., Marshall B.A. & Murray T.J. (2011). Checklist of the Recent Mollusca Recorded from the New Zealand Exclusive Economic Zone
 A.G. Beu and J.I. Raine (2009). Revised descriptions of New Zealand Cenozoic Mollusca from Beu and Maxwell (1990). GNS Science miscellaneous series no. 27

murdochi
Gastropods of New Zealand
Gastropods described in 1930